Dyckia microcalyx is a species of flowering plant in the Bromeliaceae family. This species is native to Argentina, Paraguay and Brazil.

Two varieties are recognized:

Dyckia microcalyx var. microcalyx - Paraguay, Mato Grosso do Sul
Dyckia microcalyx var. ostenii L.B.Sm. - Paraná, Misiones

References

microcalyx
Flora of South America
Plants described in 1889
Taxa named by John Gilbert Baker